Loughborough Dynamo Football Club is a football club based in Loughborough, Leicestershire, England.

History
The club was established in 1955 by pupils from Loughborough Grammar School, taking its name from Dynamo Moscow, who had recently visited England to play Wolverhampton Wanderers, with the colours taken from Wolverhampton Wanderers. After playing friendly matches for two years, they entered Division Three of the Loughborough Alliance in 1957. The club won the Division Three title in 1959–60 and were promoted to Division Two. The following season saw them finish as runners-up in Division Two, earning promotion to Division One. They went on to finish as runners-up in Division One in 1962–63 and 1963–64 before winning the Division One title in 1964–65.

Loughborough Dynamo then moved up to Division Two of the Leicester & District League. They were promoted to Division One in their first season and then again to the Premier Division in 1966–67. Although the club were relegated at the end of the 1968–69 season, they won the Division One title in 1969–70 to secure an immediate promotion back to the Premier Division. In 1972 the club transferred to Division One of the East Midlands Regional League before moving to the Premier Division of the Central Alliance the following season. However, after finishing bottom of the division, the club dropped back into Division Two of the Leicester & District League.

The 1979–80 season saw Loughborough promoted to Division One. In 1980–81 they were Division One runners-up, earning promotion to the Premier Division. Although the club were relegated back to Division One at the end of the 1982–83 season, they were promoted to the Premier Division again in 1986–87 after finishing third in Division One. In 1989 the club moved up to Division One of the Leicestershire Senior League. They won the division in 2001–02 and were promoted to the Premier Division. The following season saw them win the Leicestershire and Rutland Senior Cup. In 2003–04 the club retained the Senior Cup and were Premier Division champions, resulting in promotion to the Midland Alliance.

In 2007–08 Loughborough were Midland Alliance runners-up and were promoted to Division One South of the Northern Premier League, where they have played since.

Honours
Leicestershire Senior League
Premier Division champions 2003–04
Division One champions 2001–02
Beacon Bitter Cup winners 2003–04
Leicester & District League
Division One champions 1969–70
3 Sons Trophy winners 1980–81
Loughborough Alliance
Division One champions 1964–65
Division Three champions 1959–60
Cobin Trophy winners 1962–63, 1963–64, 1964–65
Leicestershire and Rutland Senior Cup
Winners 2002–03, 2003–04
Loughborough Charity Cup
Winners 1987–88, 2003–04, 2010–11
County FA President's Trophy
Winners 2003–04
County FA Westerby Challenge Cup
Winners 2009–10, 2011–12

Records
Best FA Cup performance: Second qualifying round, 2010–11, 2011–12, 2019–20
Best FA Trophy performance: Third qualifying round, 2020–21
Best FA Vase performance: Second round, 2004–05
Record attendance: 622 vs Shepshed Dynamo, Northern Premier League Division One Midlands, 3 January 2022

See also
Loughborough Dynamo F.C. players
Loughborough Dynamo F.C. managers

References

External links
Official website

 
Football clubs in England
Football clubs in Leicestershire
Association football clubs established in 1955
1955 establishments in England
Sport in Loughborough
North Leicestershire Football League
Leicester and District Football League
Central Alliance
Leicestershire Senior League
East Midlands Regional League
Midland Football Alliance
Northern Premier League clubs